Benjamin Franklin Hopkins (April 22, 1829 – January 1, 1870) was an American politician and telegraph operator.  He was a member of the United States House of Representatives for the last three years of his life.  Earlier he had served one term each in the Wisconsin State Senate and Wisconsin State Assembly, and had worked as a private secretary to Wisconsin Governor Coles Bashford.

Biography
Born in Granville, New York, Hopkins attended the common schools as a child and later became a telegraph operator. He moved to Fond du Lac, Wisconsin, and then to Madison, Wisconsin, in 1849, and served as a private secretary to Governor Coles Bashford in 1856 and 1857. He was exonerated of involvement in the Bashford railroad scandal in 1860. He was a member of the Wisconsin Senate in 1862 and 1863 and served in the Wisconsin State Assembly in 1866. Hopkins was elected a Republican to the United States House of Representatives in 1866 as part of the 40th United States Congress, representing Wisconsin's 2nd congressional district. He was reelected to the 41st Congress and served from 1867 until his death. There, he served as chairman of the Committee on Public Buildings and Grounds from 1869 to 1870. He died in Madison, Wisconsin, on January 1, 1870, following an attack of paralysis. He was interred in Forest Hill Cemetery in Madison. His death created a vacancy in congress that was filled by David Atwood for the remainder of the 41st Congress.

See also
List of United States Congress members who died in office (1790–1899)

References

External links

1829 births
1870 deaths
Republican Party members of the Wisconsin State Assembly
Republican Party Wisconsin state senators
People from Granville, New York
Politicians from Madison, Wisconsin
Republican Party members of the United States House of Representatives from Wisconsin
19th-century American politicians